Little sunflower is a common name for several plants and may refer to:

Helianthella
Helianthus pumilus

Little sunflower is the name of following songs:
Little Sunflower, a jazz standard composed by Freddie Hubbard and appearing on the album Backlash.